(Main list of acronyms)


 J – (s) Joule

J0–9 
 J1 – (s) Joint [Manpower &] Personnel Directorate
 J2 – (s) Joint Intelligence Directorate
 J2EE – (i) Java 2 Platform, Enterprise Edition
 J2ME – (i) Java 2 Platform, Micro Edition
 J2SE – (i) Java 2 Platform, Standard Edition
 J3 – (s) Joint Operations Directorate
 J4 – (s) Joint Logistics Directorate
 J5 – (s) Joint Strategic Plans & Policy Directorate
 J6 – (s) Joint Information Technology Directorate (Command, Control, Communications & Computer Systems)
 J7 – (s) Joint Operational Plans & Interoperability Directorate
 J8 – (s) Joint Force Structure, Resources, & Assessment Directorate
 J9 – (s) Joint Public Affairs Directorate (Civilian-Military Cooperation)

JA 
 ja – (s) Japanese language (ISO 639-1 code)
 JA – (s) Japan (FIPS 10-4 country code)
 Jabodetabek – (p) Jakarta, Bogor, Depok, Tangerang, Bekasi (urban agglomeration of Jakarta)
 JAFT – (s) Just A Field Test
 JAG – (a) Judge Advocate General Corps (military law)
 JAL – (p) Japan Airlines
 JALLC – (a) Joint Analysis and Lessons Learned Centre (NATO)
 JAM – (s) Jamaica (ISO 3166 trigram)
 JAMA – (i) Journal of the American Medical Association
 JAOA- (i) Journal of the American Osteopathic Association
 JANET – (p) Joint Academic Network
 JANUS –  (a) Joint Academic Network Using Satellites (UK) – Joint Army Navy Uniform Simulation – (p) Joint Army-Navy Staff – Just ANother Useless Simulation (Note: The U.S. Army Janus simulation is not an acronym)
 JATO – (a) Jet-Assisted Take-Off
 jav – (s) Javanese language (ISO 639-2 code)

JB 
 JB – (i) Junior Branch
 JB – (i) Jail Bait
 JBFSA – (i) Joint Blue Force Situational Awareness
JB- Justin Bieber

JC 
 JCATS – (a) Joint Conflict And Tactical Simulation ("djay-catts")
 JCDB – (i) Joint Common Data Base
 JCDS – (i) Joint Chiefs of the Defence Staff
 JCIDS – (i) Joint Capabilities Integration and Development System
 JCIET – (i) Joint Combat Identification Evaluation Team
 JCL – (i) Job Control Language
 JCMOTF – (a) Joint Civil-Military Operations Task Force
 JCP – (a) Java Community Process
 JCPM – (i) Java Child Process Manager – Jesus Christ Prison Ministry
 JCS – (i) Joint Chiefs of Staff
 JCW – (i) Juggalo Championship Wrestling

JD 
 JD
 (i) Jack Daniel's (whiskey)
 Julian day
 Juris Doctor (Latin, "doctor of jurisprudence")
 JDAM – (a/i) Joint Direct Attack Munition ("djay-dam")
 JDBC – (i) Java Data Base Connectivity
 JDCC – (i) UK Joint Doctrine and Concepts Centre, now the Development, Concepts and Doctrine Centre (DCDC)
 JDEM – (i) Joint Dark Energy Mission
 JDK – (i) Java Development Kit
 JDL – (i) Jewish Defense League
 JDM
 (i) Japanese domestic market, referring specifically to automobiles and parts
 Java Data Mining
 Joint design manufacturing

JE 
 JE – (s) Jersey (FIPS 10-4 territory code)
 JEB
 (a) James Ewell Brown (Stuart)
 John Ellis Bush
 JEDP – (i) Jahwist, Elohist, Deuteronomist, Priestly (according to the documentary hypothesis, the sources of the Torah)
 JEE – (i) Java Platform, Enterprise Edition
 JEFX – (p) Joint Expeditionary Force eXperiment
 JEPD
 (i) Jahwist, Elohist, Priestly, Deuteronomist
 Jointly Exhaustive, Pairwise Disjoint
 JET – (a) Joint European Torus
 JEZ – (a) Joint Engagement Zone

JF 
 JFACC – (i) Joint Force Air Component Commander
 JFACTSU – (a) U.K. Joint Forward Air Controller Training and Standards Unit
 JFC – (i) Joint Force Commander
 JFCOM – (p) U.S. Joint Forces Command ("jiff-comm")
 JFET – (i/a) Junction Field-Effect Transistor ("jay-fett")
 JFHQ-NCR – (i) Joint Force Headquarters National Capital Region
 JFK – (i) John Fitzgerald Kennedy or the airport named after him.
 JFLCC – (i) Joint Force Land Component Commander
 JFMCC – (i) Joint Force Maritime Component Commander
 JFO – (i) Journal of Field Ornithology
 JFSOCC – (i) Joint Force Special Operations Component Commander
 JFTX – (i) Joint Field Training Exercise
  JFF-Jamaica Football Federation

JH 
 JH – (i) Japan Highway Public Corporation
 JH – (s) Jharkhand (Indian state code)

JI 
 JI –  (i) Joint Implementation
 JIB – (a) Joint Information Bureau
 JIC – (a) Joint Intelligence Centre
 JINI – (a) Java Intelligent Network Infrastructure
 JITC – (i) Joint Interoperability Test Command
 JIVE – (a) Joint Institute for VLBI (Very Long Baseline Interferometry) in Europe

JJ 
 JJAP – (i) Japanese Journal of Applied Physics

JK 
 JK – (i) Jedi Knight – Just Kidding – (s) Spanair (IATA airline designator) – Jammu & Kashmir (Indian state code)

JL 
 JL – (s) Japan Airlines (IATA airline designator)
 JLA – (i) Justice League of America

JM 
 JM – (s) Jamaica (FIPS 10-4 country code; ISO 3166 digram)
 JMD – (s) Jamaican dollar (ISO 4217 currency code)
 JMS – (i) Java Message Service

JN 
 JN – (s) Jan Mayen Island (FIPS 10-4 territory code)
 JNI – (i) Java Native Interface
 JNLP – (i) Java Network Launch Protocol

JO 
 JO – (s) Jordan (FIPS 10-4 country code; ISO 3166 digram)
 JOA – (a/i) Joint Operations Area
 JOD – (s) Jordanian dinar (ISO 4217 currency code)
 Jofa – (p) Jonssons fabriker (Swedish, "Jonsson's Factories")
 JOPES – (a) Joint Operations Planning and Execution System
 JOR – (s) Jordan (ISO 3166 trigram)
 JOTS – (a) Joint Operations Tactical System
 JSP – (a) Joint Services Publication

JP 
 JP – (s) Japan (ISO 3166 digram) – (i) Justice of the Peace
 JPEG – (a) Joint Photographic Experts Group ("jay-peg")
 JPL – (i) Jet Propulsion Laboratory
 jpn – (s) Japanese language (ISO 639-2 code)
 JPN – (s) Japan (ISO 3166 trigram)
 JPOW – (i)  Joint Project Optic Windmill
 JPY – (s) Japanese yen (ISO 4217 currency code)

JQ 
 JQ – (s) Jetstar (IATA airline designator) –  (i) Johnny Quick – (s) Johnston Atoll (FIPS 10-4 territory code) – (i) Jonny Quest – Joshua Quagmire

JR 
 JRA – (i) Japanese Red Army – Joint Rear Area
 JRDF – (i) Joint Rapid Deployment Forces
 JRE – (i) Java Runtime Environment
 JREF – (i) James Randi Educational Foundation
 JROC – (i) Joint Requirements Oversight Council
 JROCM – (i) JROC Memorandum
 JRRF – (i) Joint Rapid Reaction Force
 JRSAI – Journal of the Royal Society of Antiquaries of Ireland

JS 
 JSAF – (a) Joint Semi-Automated Forces ("jay-saff")
 JSAP – (i) Japan Society of Applied Physics
 JSCSC – (i) Joint Services Command and Staff College
 JSD – (i) juris scientiae doctor (Latin, "doctor of science of law")
 JSDF – (i) Japan Self-Defense Forces
 JSEAD – (i) Joint Suppression of Enemy Air Defence (see SEAD)
 JSF – (i) Joint Strike Fighter
 JSIMS – (p) Joint Simulation System
 JSOA – (i) Joint Special Operations Area
 JSOTF – (i) Joint Special Operations Task Force
 JSP – (i) JavaServer Page
 JSR – (i) Java Specification Request
 JSS – (i) Joint Support Ship Project
 JSTARS – (p) Joint Surveillance Target Attack Radar System ("djay-starz")

JT 
 JT – (s) Johnston Atoll (ISO 3166 digram; obsolete 1986) – (i) Junior Technician (RAF) -- Jizz trumpet (Vulgar slang)
 JTAG – (p) Joint Test Action Group ("djay-tag")
 JTAGS – (p) Joint Tactical Ground Station ("djay-tagz")
 JTC – (i) Joint Training Confederation
 J-TENS – (a) Joint-Tactical Exploitation of National Capabilities
 JTF – (i) Joint Task Force
 JTFEX – (p) Joint Task Force Exercise
 JTIDS – (p) Joint Tactical Information Distribution System ("djay-tidz")
 JTLS – (i) Joint Theater Level Simulation
 JTMD – (i) Joint Theatre Missile Defence
 JTN – (s) Johnston Atoll (ISO 3166 trigram; obsolete 1986)
 JTRS – (a/i) Joint Tactical Radio System ("jitters")

JU 
 JU – (s) Juan de Nova Island (FIPS 10-4 territory code)
 JUGFET – (p) JUnction Gate Field-Effect Transistor
 JUICE – (p) JUpiter ICy Moon Explorer
 JUO – (i) Joint Urban Operations

JV 
 jv – (s) Javanese language (ISO 639-1 code)
 JV – (i) Joint Venture – Junior Varsity
 JVM – (i) Java virtual machine

JW 
 JW – (i) Jehovah's Witnesses
 JWARS – (p) Joint Warfare System (simulation)
 JWP – (i) Joint Warfare Publication
 JWST – (i) James Webb Space Telescope

JY 
 JY – (s) Japanese Yen

JZ 
 JZ – (i) Joint Zone

Acronyms J